The 2021 Sudamérica Rugby Sevens was the 15th edition of the Sudamérica Sevens. It was held in San José, Costa Rica from 27–28 November. It was a qualifier for the 2022 World Rugby Sevens Challenger Series in Chile and 2022 Rugby World Cup Sevens in South Africa. Uruguay and Chile were the two teams that qualified as winner and runner-up.

Format
The unconventional format for the tournament was played out in two/three parts: a pool stage (three teams per pool) in which three teams played each other once. This was followed by several inter-pool matches, with only the top two teams in each pool vying for a place in the semi-finals (teams whom finished bottom of their pool were vying for a placing position). Following the pool stage and ranking matches, there was a four team knockout round. The two semi-final winners qualified for the 2022 Rugby World Cup Sevens. The stadium of the tournament was Estadio Nacional de Costa Rica.

Teams
There were nine teams competing to qualify for the Rugby World Cup Sevens in Cape Town. As Argentina already qualified they didn't compete at the tournament.

Pool stage – Phase I

Pool A

Pool B

Pool C

Inter-pool matches – Phase II

Aggregate table

Knockout stage

5th–8th playoffs

Cup playoffs

Final standings

References

2021 rugby sevens competitions
Rugby sevens competitions in South America
December 2021 sports events in South America